The 1979–80 season was a disappointing one for Hibernian. After playing in Europe and narrowly losing the Scottish Cup in 1979, the closest they got to honours in 1980 was a convincing 5–0 semi-final loss to Celtic in the Scottish Cup. Worse still they slumped from their 1979 fifth place league finish in the league to finishing last, which led to relegation to the First Division.

Scottish Premier Division

Final League table

Scottish League Cup

Anglo-Scottish Cup

Scottish Cup

See also
List of Hibernian F.C. seasons

References

External links
Hibernian 1979/1980 results and fixtures, Soccerbase

Hibernian F.C. seasons
Hibernian